George Piper (10 June 1941 – 22 September 1968) was an Australian rugby league footballer who played as a Prop in the 1960s for Penrith and Balmain. Piper was an inaugural player for Penrith and played in the club's first season.

Playing career
Piper made his first grade debut for Balmain in 1960.  In 1964, Piper played in the grand final against St George which ended in an 11–6 loss.  In 1966, Balmain made the grand final against the same opponents where they were comprehensively beaten 23–4.  Piper did not feature in the match due to injury.  In 1967, Piper joined Penrith and played in their inaugural season where the club finished second last on the table.  In 1968, Penrith won the pre-season cup competition with Piper playing in the match.  Later that year on 22 September, Piper was killed outside a Balmain nightclub after suffering head injuries following a fight. He was 27 years of age.

References

1941 births
1968 deaths
Australian rugby league players
Penrith Panthers players
Balmain Tigers players
Rugby league props
Australian murder victims
Male murder victims
People murdered in New South Wales
Rugby league players from Sydney